Piotr Kuklis (born 14 January 1986 in Łódź) is a Polish former professional footballer who played as midfielder.

Career

Club
He was released from Widzew Łódź on 22 June 2011.

In July 2011, he joined Arka Gdynia on a one-year contract.

Honours
Zawisza Bydgoszcz
 Polish Cup: 2013–14

References

External links
 
  

1986 births
Living people
Footballers from Łódź
Widzew Łódź players
GKS Bełchatów players
Arka Gdynia players
Zawisza Bydgoszcz players
Bytovia Bytów players
Ekstraklasa players
I liga players
III liga players
Polish footballers
Poland international footballers
Poland under-21 international footballers
Association football midfielders